Gelidiella is a genus of red algae (phylum Rhodophyta). Worldwide there are 22 species of Gelidiella, mostly tropical and subtropical. Gelidiella and Gelidium are now both united into one order Gelidiales.

Gelidiella acerosa has been used in the treatment of Alzheimer's disease.

References

External links

Red algae genera
Gelidiales